Paul Francis Tompkins (born September 12, 1968) is an American comedian, actor, and writer. He is known for his work in television on such programs as Mr. Show with Bob and David, Real Time with Bill Maher, and Best Week Ever, later renamed Best Week Ever with Paul F. Tompkins.

He is known for his numerous appearances on podcasts, including his 200-plus appearances on Comedy Bang! Bang! He has also been the host of the Fusion Channel talk show No, You Shut Up!, The Dead Authors Podcast, the online Made Man interview series Speakeasy with Paul F. Tompkins, the Earwolf podcast Spontaneanation with Paul F. Tompkins, and The Pod F. Tompkast, which was ranked #1 by Rolling Stone on their list of "The 10 Best Comedy Podcasts of the Moment" in 2011.

He is also a main cast member of the Superego podcast and was a regular player on Thrilling Adventure Hour podcast, which ended in 2015. Tompkins was the voice of Mr. Peanutbutter, an anthropomorphic yellow , on the Netflix animated series BoJack Horseman from 2014 to 2020. He has also appeared in drama films like There Will Be Blood and The Informant!. In 2021, he had a recurring role on the sitcom Rutherford Falls.

In December 2014, Paste named his Twitter one of "The 75 Best Twitter Accounts of 2014", ranking it at #70.

Early life
Paul Francis Tompkins was born September 12, 1968, in Mount Airy, Philadelphia, Pennsylvania. He has about two brothers (one older, one younger) and three sisters (all older).

Career

Early work
In 1986, Tompkins first performed comedy at 17 years of age at The Comedy Works in Philadelphia (a club now located in Bristol, Pennsylvania), where he performed as half of a sketch comedy duo with Rick Roman. Tompkins attended Temple University; however, he dropped out and left for Los Angeles, California, in 1994.

Tompkins met actor Jay Johnston in L.A. through their mutual friend, actor and director Adam McKay. McKay and Tompkins had become friends in Philadelphia, where they had both started to perform stand-up at around the same time. McKay later moved to Chicago and met Johnston; Johnston moved to L.A. at around the same time as Tompkins and McKay introduced the two. Tompkins and Johnston went on to create a live sketch comedy show called "The Skates" that was seen by Bob Odenkirk and David Cross and helped get them hired to work on Mr. Show with Bob and David in 1996.

Live comedic performance
Tompkins's comedy career has included stand-up, sketch comedy and a variety of other live performances.

Tompkins's stand-up comedy performances are of a storytelling and observationalist style. His shows often consist of extended riffs and long anecdotes. Tompkins deals with topics of the bizarre and the absurd—such as a rant about peanut brittle, a discussion about cake versus pie, and smashed coins—in addition to recounting stories about his own life experiences and family. His comedic style has been described as alternative comedy; Tompkins has stated that he is not bothered by the label and that he likes the term.

Tompkins is known for his style of dress during his live comedic performances, always performing in suit and tie, sometimes in pinstripes and with a bowtie; his look has been described by some in the press as "dapper". Tompkins has described his look as "foppish" and "just this side of Cedric the Entertainer."

Tompkins is based in Los Angeles and performs regularly in the city. Since 2002 he has performed a monthly show called The Paul F. Tompkins Show at Largo, an L.A. nightclub and cabaret. His show has featured such guests as Fiona Apple, Jack Black, Dave Foley, Zach Galifianakis, Ed Helms, Aimee Mann, and Weird Al Yankovic. Since its inception in 2005, Tompkins has taken part in the Thrilling Adventure Hour, a staged production in the style of old-time radio that is also held monthly at Largo. The show began podcasting in January 2011; in October of that same year the show's podcasts moved to the Nerdist Industries podcast network created by Chris Hardwick. Tompkins is a member of the Upright Citizens Brigade Theatre (UCB) Los Angeles. His comedy album "Impersonal" was recorded live at the UCB Theatre. He also performs monthly at the "Dead Authors" show at UCB Theatre in support of the nonprofit organization 826LA; Tompkins plays the role of H.G. Wells who serves as the host of the show.

Tompkins has toured in the US and Canada and prefers to perform in independent venues, rather than conventional comedy clubs. Starting in 2009 he embarked on his "Tompkins 300" tour. Tompkins had been preparing for his one-hour Comedy Central special You Should Have Told Me at the Laughing Skull Lounge theatre in Atlanta, Georgia—a small theatre that seats about 74 people. In order to fill the seats for the recording of his special, Tompkins required about 280 people in the audience over the course of four nights for the recording of his show. Tompkins decided to announce on Twitter that he needed 300 people to fill the seats each night. 

Bob Kerr, a Canadian comedian, saw the Twitter post and asked if Tompkins would like to perform in Toronto. Tompkins advised Kerr that if he was able to get 300 people to state that they would definitely see his show he would come to Toronto. Kerr then started a Facebook group called "I Wanna See Paul F. Tompkins in Toronto" and managed to get 300 people to join. In October of that same year Tompkins performed at The Rivoli night club in Toronto, the same club in which the sketch comedy troupe The Kids in the Hall got their start. Facebook groups were subsequently started in other North American cities and in 2010 he stated that he had stopped promoting his shows on the radio. In 2011 he said that the Facebook 300 groups had become his main method of booking comedy shows.

Tompkins wrote and performed in his one-man show, Driven to Drink, which aired on HBO in 1998. He appeared on 6 episodes of Late Night with Conan O'Brien between 1998 and 2008 as well as two episodes of Conan in 2011 and 2012. He has recorded three comedy albums: Impersonal in 2007, Freak Wharf in 2009, and Laboring Under Delusions in 2012. His stand-up appearances on the Comedy Central network include being featured in episodes of Comedy Central Presents in 2003 and 2007, hosting an episode of Live at Gotham in 2009, performing on John Oliver's New York Stand Up Show in 2010, and recording two original one-hour comedy specials—You Should Have Told Me which aired in 2010 and Paul F. Tompkins: Laboring Under Delusions in 2012. He also appeared in the RiffTrax live broadcast of House on Haunted Hill.

Acting and writing
Tompkins wrote for and performed on Mr. Show with Bob and David from 1995 to 1998; the show's writers, including Tompkins, were nominated for an Emmy Award in 1998 for "Outstanding Writing for a Variety or Music Program".

Tompkins's work with Mr. Show's creators Bob Odenkirk and David Cross also led to his recurring role on the Tenacious D TV series. Tompkins played the character of a nightclub manager who is duped into reading Tenacious D's ridiculous introductions during their open mic performances. He revived the role in the comedic band's film Tenacious D in The Pick of Destiny released in 2006.

Longtime friend Adam McKay consulted Tompkins regarding the screenplay for Talladega Nights. Tompkins also played the MC of a cat show in McKay's Anchorman: The Legend of Ron Burgundy.

Tompkins has appeared on television programs including NewsRadio, Frasier, Weeds, The Sarah Silverman Program, Pushing Daisies, Community, and Curb Your Enthusiasm. Tompkins played the role of Prescott in Paul Thomas Anderson's film There Will Be Blood (2007); Anderson had previously cast Tompkins in a small role in the 1999 film Magnolia after watching Tompkins perform at Largo. Tompkins also played FBI Agent Anthony D’Angelo in Steven Soderbergh's The Informant! (2009). He has a recurring role in the Canadian TV series The L.A. Complex as a fictionalized version of himself. He also appeared in the music video for Nick Lowe's song "Stoplight Roses" and in the Ted Leo and the Pharmacists song "Bottled In Cork". Tompkins wrote for Real Time with Bill Maher in 2003 and 2009, in addition to being a show correspondent in the show's first season. In 2011 Tompkins was asked to write humorous recaps of American Idol episodes for New York magazine's online blog Vulture.

Tompkins has expressed in interviews that he dislikes writing (particularly writing for others), preferring instead to perform in front of a camera.

Voice acting
Tompkins has done voice work for many animated television series including Dr. Katz, Professional Therapist, King of the Hill, and Bob's Burgers, in which he voices the recurring character Randy. He lent his voice to a character in an unaired 2007 episode of Aqua Teen Hunger Force titled "Boston" that was supposed to be the premiere episode of the show's fifth season, but it was pulled by Turner Broadcasting System to avoid further controversy surrounding the 2007 Boston bomb scare. 

Tompkins later appeared in an episode during the show's 7th season. He was also the voice of one of the thugs in Walt Disney Animation Studios' 2010 computer animated film Tangled. Tompkins was the voice of Benton Criswell, a character in MTV series Super Adventure Team which featured marionettes in the style of the 1960s British series Thunderbirds; the role was credited under the stage name Francis Mt. Pleasant. He was the voice of a puppet in ads for the Ford Focus. 

Tompkins played Mr. Peanutbutter in the 2014 Netflix original animated series BoJack Horseman. Tompkins voices the recurring character, Gladstone Gander, in the reboot series of DuckTales. In 2020, he voiced Dr. Migleemo, a therapist aboard the USS Cerritos in the CBS All Access animated series Star Trek: Lower Decks.

Political and social commentary
Tompkins has appeared on several television programs devoted to discussing politics, popular culture and current events; however, he says he does not consider himself to be a political comic.

Tompkins was a contributor to the "Us People's Weekly Entertainment" segment of The Daily Show in 1998. In 2003 he was a writer and correspondent for Real Time with Bill Maher in the show's first season and wrote again for the show in 2009. He appeared on Tough Crowd with Colin Quinn in 2004. In 2004 he also became a pop culture analyst on VH1's Best Week Ever; in 2008 the show was retooled and relaunched as Best Week Ever with Paul F. Tompkins with Tompkins as host. From 2006 to 2008 he was a regular guest on Countdown with Keith Olbermann. In 2008 he appeared on Lewis Black's Root of All Evil and took part in a panel on Larry King Live in an episode titled "Politics & Humor".

Tompkins has appeared in documentaries such as Jamie Kennedy's Heckler (2007) and Doug Benson's Super High Me (2007). He also appeared in The Bitter Buddha (2013), a documentary about the career of actor and comedian Eddie Pepitone.

Tompkins later became the host of a discussion show called No, You Shut Up! by The Jim Henson Company under its Henson Alternative banner.

Podcasts, webcasts and radio
In 2010, Tompkins launched his podcast called The Pod F. Tompkast. The podcast was a mixture of Tompkins discussing various topics, clips from his live show at Largo, and segments where Tompkins voices a variety of celebrities speaking with one another. Comedian Jen Kirkman was a regular contributor on the show. The podcast ended in 2012.

The Thrilling Adventure Hour comedy show at Largo began podcasting in January 2011; in October of that same year the show's podcasts moved to the Nerdist Industries podcast network created by Chris Hardwick. The show ended in 2015.

Dead Authors, a live show that Tompkins hosts at the UCB Theatre in Los Angeles, also began podcasting in September 2011.

In May 2012 Tompkins started a weekly web series called Speakeasy. Hosted by the Break Media site MadeMan.com, the series features Tompkins interviewing various guests in the entertainment industry, such as Ty Burrell, Nathan Fillion, Zach Galifianakis, Chris Hardwick, Oscar Nunez, Weird Al Yankovic, and Alison Brie. The interviews are conducted as casual conversations between Tompkins and his guests over cocktails at various bars in the L.A. area.

Tompkins has appeared well over 200 times as a guest, and occasionally as a guest host, on Comedy Bang! Bang! (formerly Comedy Death-Ray Radio), a weekly audio podcast hosted by Scott Aukerman, a comedian who also wrote for Mr. Show with Bob and David. The show's format mixes conversation between the host and guests, and usually includes improv games. Some guests play characters or impersonate certain celebrities, usually for the entirety of the episode; Paul F. Tompkins has impersonated celebrities such as rapper Ice-T, composer Andrew Lloyd Webber, and Buddy Valastro from the reality television series Cake Boss (cakeboss.).

In addition to Aukerman's Comedy Bang! Bang!, Tompkins has appeared on the podcasts of other fellow comedians such as WTF with Marc Maron, Jimmy Pardo's Never Not Funny, Jessica Chaffin and Jamie Denbo's Ronna and Beverly podcast, and the Superego podcast with Jeremy Carter, Matt Gourley, and Mark McConville. Tompkins has also been a regular guest on the radio show and podcast The Best Show on WFMU with Tom Scharpling.

In 2015, Tompkins created his own podcast on the Earwolf podcast network called Spontaneanation with Paul F. Tompkins. This podcast is similar to the Pod F. Tompkast; however, Spontaneanation is fully improvised and in-the-moment, as opposed to the Tompkast, which was highly produced. Spontaneanation begins with an improvised monologue, accompanied on piano by Eban Schletter, much like the Pod F. Tompkast. The next segment is an interview with one of Tompkins's famous friends. The final segment is one long improvised story performed by Paul and guest improvisers, based on ideas discussed in the interview segment. The podcast ended in 2019.

Since 2019, Tompkins has cohosted, with Nicole Parker, The Neighborhood Listen on Stitcher Premium. Along with Tawny Newsome, he also hosts The Pod Directive, the official Star Trek podcast, which launched in September 2020.

In March 2020, during the COVID-19 pandemic, Paul started a weekly podcast with his wife, Janie Haddad Tompkins, called Stay F. Homekins. The first season ran for 41 episodes throughout the rest of 2020, and season two started in January 2021.

Personal life
Tompkins is married to actress Janie Haddad Tompkins.

In 2017, Tompkins stated on Twitter that he was once a Catholic, but later went on to become an atheist.

He is a member of the Democratic Socialists of America and helped canvass for Eunisses Hernandez and Hugo Soto-Martinez during the 2022 Los Angeles elections.

Filmography

Film

Television

Discography
 2007 – Impersonal (CD; released on AST Records)
 2007 – Comedy Death-Ray (Compilation released on Comedy Central Records)
 2009 – Freak Wharf (CD) (Released on AST Records)
 2010 – Sir, You Have Fooled Me Twice (EP; released on AST Records)
 2010 – You Should Have Told Me (DVD; released on AST Records)
 2012 – Laboring Under Delusions (DVD; released on Comedy Central Records)
 2012 – Laboring Under Delusions: Live in Brooklyn (CD; released on AST Records)
 2015 - Crying and Driving (MP3)

Podcast and radio appearances
Tompkins is known for his many podcast appearances, as well as hosting a few of his own. He is often referred to as the mayor of podcasts.

References

External links

 
 
 
The Pod F. Tompkast

1968 births
20th-century American comedians
20th-century American male actors
21st-century American comedians
21st-century American male actors
American atheists
American male comedians
American male film actors
American male television actors
American male television writers
American male voice actors
American people of Irish descent
American podcasters
American sketch comedians
American stand-up comedians
American television talk show hosts
American television writers
American writers of Italian descent
Former Roman Catholics
Living people
Male actors from Philadelphia
Members of the Democratic Socialists of America
Screenwriters from Pennsylvania
Temple University alumni